Yogendra Rae Yadav is a Nepalese politician who is elected member of Provincial Assembly of Madhesh Province from People's Socialist Party, Nepal. Mandal, a resident of Rajdevi was elected to the 2017 provincial assembly election from Rautahat 1(B).

Electoral history

2017 Nepalese provincial elections

References

External links

Living people
1977 births
Members of the Provincial Assembly of Madhesh Province
Madhesi people
People from Rautahat District
People's Socialist Party, Nepal politicians
21st-century Nepalese politicians